Foreigner is a British-American rock band from New York City and London. Formed in 1976, the group originally included lead vocalist Lou Gramm, lead guitarist and keyboardist and vocalist Mick Jones, rhythm guitarist and woodwind player Ian McDonald, bassist Ed Gagliardi, drummer Dennis Elliott, and keyboardist Al Greenwood.

The band's current lineup includes lead vocalist Kelly Hansen (since 2005), lead guitarist Mick Jones (since 1976, and the only remaining original member), bassist Jeff Pilson (since 2004), keyboardist Michael Bluestein (since 2008), rhythm and lead guitarist Bruce Watson (since 2011), drummer Chris Frazier (since 2012) and rhythm guitarist Luis Maldonado (since 2021).

History

1976–1995
Foreigner was formed in April 1976 by former Leslie West Band guitarist Mick Jones, with the original lineup also including former Black Sheep vocalist Lou Gramm, former King Crimson keyboardist and woodwind player Ian McDonald, bassist Ed Gagliardi, former Ian Hunter drummer Dennis Elliott, and keyboardist Al Greenwood. After two albums – 1977's Foreigner and 1978's Double Vision – Gagliardi left the band in April 1979 and was replaced by Rick Wills, formerly of Small Faces. Following the release and promotion of 1979's Head Games, McDonald and Greenwood were fired in September 1980. The group remained a quartet and released 4 in 1981. For the album's promotional tour, McDonald's vacated spot was taken by Mark Rivera, while Bob Mayo and Peter Reilich performed live keyboards. Foreigner's lineup remained the same for Agent Provocateur and Inside Information, before Gramm announced his departure from the band in May 1990 due to differences with Jones and to focus on his solo career.

Jones replaced Gramm with Johnny Edwards, formerly of Montrose, Buster Brown, King Kobra, and Wild Horses, who contributed to the group's next album, Unusual Heat. Keyboardist Jeff Jacobs joined after the album's release. The Unusual Heat touring cycle was the last for Elliott, who left the band in 1993. The drummer had ceased working with the group in 1991, with Larry Aberman filling in on tour, before Mark Schulman joined in early 1992 in time to perform on three new tracks for The Very Best ... and Beyond. The new recordings also marked the return of Gramm, who rejoined Foreigner in May 1992 after working out his differences with Jones during the Los Angeles riots; he also brought his own bassist Bruce Turgon to replace the outgoing Wills. For a tour in promotion of the compilation, Thom Gimbel joined on guitar and saxophone, before Scott Gilman took over the following year when Gimbel returned to touring with Aerosmith. The group released and promoted its next album, Mr. Moonlight, in 1994.

1995 onwards
After the end of the Mr. Moonlight touring cycle, Gilman left Foreigner and Gimbel returned in his place. Around the same time, in January 1995, Schulman was replaced by Ron Wikso on drums. The group continued touring, but did not release any new material before Brian Tichy replaced Wikso in April 1998. Schulman returned for a second stint in 2000, before Denny Carmassi took over in time for the group's 25th anniversary tour in 2002. After the tour ended in early 2003, Gramm and Turgon left Foreigner, and the band was put on hiatus for over a year. Jones, now the sole remaining original member of the group, reformed Foreigner for a one-off charity show in July 2004 with a lineup including Gimbel and Jacobs, plus vocalist Chas West, bassist Jeff Pilson and drummer Jason Bonham. Early the following year, the group reformed on a permanent basis, adding new frontman Kelly Hansen in place of West. The group's lineup remained stable until December 2007, when long-time member Jacobs left.

Jacobs was replaced for Foreigner's final shows of 2007 by Paul Mirkovich, who later made way for Michael Bluestein in early 2008. Bonham also left in August 2008, to be replaced briefly by Bryan Head and later by the returning Tichy. Foreigner released its first studio album in 15 years, Can't Slow Down, in 2009. After the subsequent touring cycle, Jason Sutter took over from Tichy in May 2010, although within a year he had been replaced by Schulman. During a tour in 2011, Jones was unable to perform a number of shows due to undisclosed reasons; he was replaced by Joel Hoekstra and later Bruce Watson for select dates, the latter of whom remained a full-time member of the group. Schulman left again in August 2012, with Tichy filling in before Chris Frazier's arrival the next month.

In recent years, Foreigner has reunited on several occasions with numerous past members. In July 2017, Lou Gramm, Al Greenwood and Ian McDonald performed a three-song encore with the current lineup of the group. In October, the same three alumni returned to perform five songs and join the current lineup for an encore of two more, in addition to Rick Wills and Dennis Elliott. Late the following year, the reunions expanded into a series of four special shows featuring all aforementioned past members, dubbed "Double Vision: Then and Now".

Members

Current

Former

Touring

Session

Timeline

Lineups

References

External links
Foreigner official website

Foreigner